Sharis Cid (Born María del Rosario Cid Pérez, 5 September 1970 in Chihuahua, Chih., Mexico) is a Mexican actress who has participated in several telenovelas, such as DKDA, Salud, Dinero y Amor and La Intrusa. She was also a singer in Roll and DKDA.

Sharis has a 15-year-old daughter named Kristal. Sharis was also in Big Brother VIP, third season. She did not win and was the character that cried the most in the show. She likes to travel to Spain and Argentina. She has two younger brothers, Sergio and Ricardo. They all live in Mexico. Sharis was also in a play in Mexico City with Jorge Ortiz de Pineda.

References

Notes
Other sources cite Cid's birth year as 1973.
Her professional name was inspired by that of Hollywood musical star Cyd Charisse.

External links

Mexican telenovela actresses
People from Chihuahua City
1970 births
Living people